The Lagaunspitze is a mountain in the Saldurkamm group of the Ötztal Alps. It forms a double peak with the slightly lower Saldurspitze to the northwest.

Mountains of South Tyrol
Mountains of the Alps
Alpine three-thousanders
Ötztal Alps

References